Xingú Asuriní (Asurini of Xingu) is a Tupi–Guaraní language of the state of Pará, in the Amazon region of Brazil. The entire population speaks the language, and most speakers are monolingual.

References

External links

Tupi–Guarani languages